Hellenic Army is commanded by the Hellenic Army General Staff which supervises five major commands. These are:

First Army 

 First Army (1η Στρατια), headquartered at Larisa, Thessaly which includes
 1st Armored Cavalry Battalion
 730th Engineer Battalion
 476th Signal Battalion
 485th Signal Battalion
 488th Signal Battalion
 489th Signal Battalion
 First Army Air Defense Artillery Command
 181st Medium Range Air Defense Battalion
 182nd Short Range Air Defense Battalion
 I Infantry Division(I ΜΠ), based at Veroia, Macedonia
 1st Raider/Paratrooper Brigade
 32nd Marines Brigade
 71st Airmobile Infantry Brigade
 1st Army Aviation Brigade
 II Mechanised Infantry Division (II Μ/Κ ΜΠ), based at Edessa, Macedonia
  24th Armored Brigade
 33rd Mechanized Infantry Brigade
 34th Mechanized Infantry Brigade

IV Army Corps 

 IV Army Corps (Δ' Σώμα Στρατού), headquartered at Xanthi, Thrace comprising the following units:
 Corps HQ Battalion
 971st Military Police Battalion
 1st Communications, EW, Surveillance Regiment
 473rd Surveillance Battalion
 476th EW Battalion
 479th Signal Battalion
 Corps Engineer Command
 Corps Field and Air Defense Artillery Command
 1st Artillery Regiment-MLRS
 1st AR Headquarters Company
 36th Signal Company
 193rd Multiple Rocket Launcher Battalion
 194th Multiple Rocket Launcher Battalion
 Observation Battery
 171st Short Range Air Defense Battalion
 173rd Short Range Air Defense Battalion
 174th Short Range Air Defense Battalion
 199th Self Propelled Heavy Artillery Battalion
 XII Mechanized Infantry Division (XII Μ/Κ ΜΠ), based at Alexandroupoli, Thrace
 XVI Mechanized Infantry Division (XVI Μ/Κ ΜΠ), based at Didymoteicho, Thrace
  20th Armored Division (XX ΤΘΜ), based at Kavala, Macedonia
 50th Mechanized Infantry Brigade "Apsos"
 29th Mechanized Brigade "Pogradets"

III Army Corps 
III Army Corps (Γ' Σώμα Στρατού) doubles as a NATO Deployable Corps:

 III Army Corps, based at Thessaloniki, Macedonia
  1st Infantry Regiment
  8th Infantry Brigade
  9th Infantry Brigade
  10th Mechanized  Infantry Brigade
  15th Infantry Brigade
 3rd Signals Brigade

ASDEN 

 Supreme Military Command of Interior and Islands (ΑΣΔΕΝ), based at Athens, Attica
  5th Airmobile Brigade (5η Α/Μ ΤΑΞ), based at Chania, Crete
  79th National Guard Higher Command (79 ΑΔΤΕ), based at Samos
 80th National Guard Higher Command (80 ΑΔΤΕ), based at Kos, Dodecanese
 88th Military Command (88 ΣΔΙ), based at Myrina, Lemnos
 95th National Guard Higher Command (95 ΑΔΤΕ), based at Rhodes, Dodecanese
 96th National Guard Higher Command (96 ΑΔΤΕ), based at Chios
 98th National Guard Higher Command (98 ΑΔΤΕ), based at Lesbos

Supreme Military Support Command 
 Supreme Military Support Command (ΑΣΔΥΣ), based at Athens, Attica that includes
 Supply Center Southern Greece, (ΚΕΦΝΕ), based at Athens, Attica
 Supply Center Northern Greece, (ΚΕΦΒΕ), based at Thessaloniki, Macedonia
 4th Support Brigade (4η ΤΑΞΥΠ), based at Xanthi, Thrace
 651 Army Material Depot (651 ΑΒΥΠ), based at Agios Stefanos, Attica
 Military Factories Command (ΔΙΣΕ), based at Athens, Attica divided in
 301st Base Factory (301 ΕΒ), based at Agioi Anargyroi, Attica
 303rd Base Factory (303 ΠΕΒ), based at Larissa, Thessaly
 304rd Base Factory (304 ΠΕΒ), based at Velestino, Thessaly
 308rd Base Factory (308 ΠΕΒ), based at Thessaloniki, Macedonia
 Doctrine, Training and Inspection Command (ΔΙΔΟΕ), based at Athens, Attica

See also 
 Hellenic Army

References 

Military units and formations of the Hellenic Army